It is the 2022–23 season of the Women's Volleyball team of Galatasaray Sports Club.

Overview

August
On 3 August 2022, a new 2-year contract was signed with Head Coach Ataman Güneyligil.

On 5 August 2022, Asuman Baş was appointed as the Manager of the Women's Volleyball Team.

Dehri Can Dehrioğlu was appointed as the assistant coach of the Women's Volleyball Team on 9 August 2022.

The fixtures of the Misli.com Sultanlar Ligi for the 2022–23 volleyball season were determined with the drawing of lots held at the Ankara Headquarters of the Turkish Volleyball Federation on August 12, 2022.

October
In the notification made on 6 October 2022, it was announced that Galatasaray HDI Sigorta Women's Volleyball Team will participate in the Sardes Cup to be held in Manisa in order to support the treatment expenses of Duru Sağlık baby, who has SMA.

In the notification made on 7 October 2022, it was announced that the Muhammet Görken Tournament, which will be hosted by Galatasaray HDI Sigorta Women's Volleyball Team, will start. The tournament, between 13–14 October, is organized in the name of Muhammet Görken, who struggled with MSA, who worked on volleyball.

Sponsorship and kit manufacturers

Supplier: Umbro
Name sponsor: HDI Sigorta
Main sponsor: Daikin
Jersey top sponsor: Tunç Holding
Back sponsor: Garnet Trade

Sleeve sponsor: —
Lateral sponsor: GSMobile
Short sponsor: HDI Sigorta
Socks sponsor: —

Technical Staff

Team roster

Transfers

New contracts

In

Out

Pre-season and friendlies

|}

Competitions

Turkish Women's Volleyball League (Misli.com Sultanlar Ligi)

League table

Regular season (1st Half)
All times are Europe Time (UTC+03:00).																						

|}

Regular season (2nd Half)
All times are Europe Time (UTC+03:00).																						

|}

Turkish Women's Volleyball Cup (Axa Sigorta Kupa Voley)

Group C

|}

Results
All times are Europe Time (UTC+03:00).																						

|}

Quarter-finals
All times are Europe Time (UTC+03:00).																						

|}

Women's CEV Cup

16th Finals

|}

References

External links
 Official Galatasaray Volleyball Branch Website 
 Official Twitter Account of Galatasaray Sports Club Volleyball Branch 
 Galatasaray HDI Sigorta » players __ Women Volleybox.net 
 Turkish Volleyball Federastion Official Website 

Galatasaray S.K. (women's volleyball) seasons
Galatasaray Sports Club 2022–23 season